Emad is an Iranian-designed, liquid-fuel, medium-range ballistic missile (MRBM), a derivative of Shahab-3.

Description 
The Emad can carry a 750 kg payload at a range of 1700 km with 10 m accuracy. It uses a new nose cone design, which is different from that of the original Shahab-3. The changed design may also make it possible for the warhead to detonate high above a target, which makes it more suitable for an air burst chemical, biological or nuclear weapon detonation, as well as for nuclear electromagnetic pulse attack.The missile was presented by Brigadier General Hossein Dehghan on 11 October 2015. Emad features a newly designed reentry vehicle with a more advanced guidance and control system, making it the country's first IRBM that is precision-guided.  The missile features a Maneuverable reentry vehicle (MARV).
The missile has an advanced guidance and control system in its nose cone, and it is said to have an accuracy of about 50 meters. The missile, which appears to be another variant of the Shahab-3, was expected to be delivered to the armed forces some time in 2016.

See also 
 Military of Iran
 Iranian military industry
 List of military equipment manufactured in Iran
 Iran's missile forces
 Ghadr-110
 Iranian underground missile bases
 Missile Magazine System
 Equipment of the Iranian Army
 Science and technology in Iran

References

External links 
CSIS Missile Threat - Emad

Ballistic missiles of Iran
Medium-range ballistic missiles of Iran
Surface-to-surface missiles of Iran
Theatre ballistic missiles
Intermediate-range ballistic missiles of Iran